William A. Witbeck House is a historic home located at Stuyvesant in Columbia County, New York.  It was built about 1812 and is a -story, five-by-two-bay, wood-frame dwelling in a transitional Dutch / Federal style.  It is topped by a gable roof with seam metal roofing and the exterior is sheathed in clapboards.

It was added to the National Register of Historic Places in 1994.

References

Houses on the National Register of Historic Places in New York (state)
Federal architecture in New York (state)
Houses in Columbia County, New York
National Register of Historic Places in Columbia County, New York